In mathematics, particularly in functional analysis and topology, the closed graph theorem is a result connecting the continuity of certain kinds of functions to a topological property of their graph.  In its most elementary form, the closed graph theorem states that a linear function between two Banach spaces is continuous if and only if the graph of that function is closed.  

The closed graph theorem has extensive application throughout functional analysis, because it can control whether a partially-defined linear operator admits continuous extensions.  For this reason, it has been generalized to many circumstances beyond the elementary formulation above.

Preliminaries
The closed graph theorem is a result about linear map  between two vector spaces endowed with topologies making them into topological vector spaces (TVSs).
The  of this function is the subset 

of  where  denotes the function's domain.
Similarly,  is said to have a  if  is a sequentially closed subset of  

A  is a linear map whose graph is closed (it need not be continuous or bounded). 
It is common in functional analysis to call such maps "closed", but this should not be confused the non-equivalent notion of a "closed map" that appears in general topology.

Partial functions

It is common in functional analysis to consider partial functions, which are functions defined on a dense subset of some space  
Since the domain is denoted by  it is not always necessary to assign a symbol (such as ) to a partial function's domain, in which case the notation  or  may be used to indicate that  is a partial function with codomain  whose domain  is a dense subset of  
A densely defined linear operator between vector spaces is a partial function  whose domain  is a dense vector subspace of a TVS  such that  is a linear map. 
A prototypical example of a partial function is the derivative operator, which is only defined on the space  of once continuously differentiable functions, a dense subset of the space  of continuous functions. 

Every partial function is, in particular, a function and so all terminology for functions can be applied to them. For instance, the graph of a partial function  is (as before) the set 
 
However, one exception to this is the definition of "closed graph".

Closable maps and closures

Characterizations of closed graphs (general topology)

Function with a closed graph

If  is a function then it is said to have a  if it satisfies any of the following are equivalent conditions:
For every  and net  in  such that  in  if  is such that the net  in  then 

and if  is a Hausdorff compact space then we may add to this list: 
 is continuous.

 has a sequentially closed graph in 

Function with a sequentially closed graph

If  is a function then the following are equivalent:
 has a sequentially closed graph in 
For every  and sequence  in  such that  in  if  is such that the net  in  then

Basic properties of maps with closed graphs

Suppose  is a linear operator between Banach spaces.

If  is closed, then its kernel (or nullspace) is a closed vector subspace of 
If  is closed and injective then its inverse  is also closed.

Examples and counterexamples

Continuous but not closed maps

Then  is continuous but its graph is not closed in 
If  is any space then the identity map  is continuous but its graph, which is the diagonal  is closed in  if and only if  is Hausdorff.  In particular, if  is not Hausdorff then  is continuous but not closed.
If  is a continuous map whose graph is not closed then  is not a Hausdorff space.

Closed but not continuous maps

Consider the derivative operator  where is the Banach space of all continuous functions on an interval 
If one takes its domain  to be  then  is a closed operator, which is not bounded. 
On the other hand, if  is the space  of smooth functions scalar valued functions then  will no longer be closed, but it will be closable, with the closure being its extension defined on 
Let  and  both denote the real numbers  with the usual Euclidean topology.
Let  denote the real numbers  with the usual Euclidean topology, let  denote  with the discrete topology, and let  be the identity map (i.e.  for every ). Then  is a linear map whose graph is closed in  but it is clearly not continuous (since singleton sets are open in  but not in ).

Closed graph theorems

Between Banach spaces

The usual proof of the closed graph theorem employs the open mapping theorem. 
In fact, the closed graph theorem, the open mapping theorem and the bounded inverse theorem are all equivalent. 

Complete metrizable codomain

The closed graph theorem can be generalized from Banach spaces to more abstract topological vector spaces in the following ways.

Between F-spaces

There are versions that does not require  to be locally convex.

This theorem is restated and extend it with some conditions that can be used to determine if a graph is closed:

Complete pseudometrizable codomain

Every metrizable topological space is pseudometrizable. A pseudometrizable space is metrizable if and only if it is Hausdorff.

Codomain not complete or (pseudo) metrizable

An even more general version of the closed graph theorem is

Borel graph theorem

The Borel graph theorem, proved by L. Schwartz, shows that the closed graph theorem is valid for linear maps defined on and valued in most spaces encountered in analysis. 
Recall that a topological space is called a Polish space if it is a separable complete metrizable space and that a Souslin space is the continuous image of a Polish space.  The weak dual of a separable Fréchet space and the strong dual of a separable Fréchet-Montel space are Souslin spaces.  Also, the space of distributions and all Lp-spaces over open subsets of Euclidean space as well as many other spaces that occur in analysis are Souslin spaces. 
The Borel graph theorem states:

An improvement upon this theorem, proved by A. Martineau, uses K-analytic spaces.

A topological space  is called a  if it is the countable intersection of countable unions of compact sets.

A Hausdorff topological space  is called K-analytic if it is the continuous image of a  space (that is, if there is a  space  and a continuous map of  onto ).

Every compact set is K-analytic so that there are non-separable K-analytic spaces.  Also, every Polish, Souslin, and reflexive Fréchet space is K-analytic as is the weak dual of a Frechet space. 
The generalized Borel graph theorem states:

Related results

If  is closed linear operator from a Hausdorff locally convex TVS  into a Hausdorff finite-dimensional TVS  then  is continuous.

See also

References

Notes

Bibliography

  
  
  
  
  
  
  
  
  
  
  
  
  
  
  
  
  
  
  
  
  
 

Theorems in functional analysis